Sparviero has been the name of at least four ships of the Italian Navy and may refer to:

 , a torpedo boat launched in 1888. 
 , an  ordered by Romania as Vijele. Seized in 1915 by Italy and renamed before her launch in 1917. Purchased again by Romania in 1920 and renamed Marasti.
 , previously the passenger liner . Conversion started in 1942 with the name Falco and then renamed Sparviero but the conversion was never finished. She was seized by Germany in 1943 and scuttled in 1944.
 , a  launched in 1973 and retired in 1991.

Italian Navy ship names